Michael S. Sullivan (April 2, 1876 – May 22, 1929) was a civil engineer, surveyor and politician in Newfoundland. He represented Placentia and St. Mary's from 1904 to 1909 as a Liberal and from 1919 to 1928  as a Liberal-Labour-Progressive and Placentia West from 1928 to 1929 as a Liberal-Conservative Progressive in the Newfoundland House of Assembly.

Biography 
The son of Patrick Sullivan and Selma Brown, he was born in Presque on April 2, 1876, and was educated at Saint Bonaventure's College. He married Kathleen Eleanor Thomson in 1903 and they had two children. He worked for the Reid Newfoundland Company until 1914 when he went into business on his own as a pulp wood agent. Sullivan was defeated by a People's Party candidate when he ran for reelection in 1909. He served as a lieutenant-colonel in the Newfoundland Forestry Battalion during World War I. He was reelection in 1919 and served in the Newfoundland cabinet as a minister without portfolio from 1924 to 1928 and as Colonial Secretary in 1928. He also served as a Railway Commissioner. He died in office in St. John's on May 22, 1929.

References 

1876 births
1929 deaths
Liberal Party of Newfoundland and Labrador MHAs
Newfoundland military personnel of World War I
Government ministers of the Dominion of Newfoundland
Colonial Secretaries of Newfoundland
Royal Newfoundland Regiment officers